Ripley Publishing is a publisher based in Orlando, Florida. The company was set up in 2008 by Ripley Entertainment (owned by the Jim Pattison Group), owner of the Ripley's Believe It or Not! brand of museums, cartoons, television shows and books. The company publishes the New York Times bestselling Ripley's Believe It or Not! Annual and a range of other Believe It or Not! titles.

Selected titles
Ripley's Believe It or Not Annual
Ripley's RBI children's fiction series
Ripley's Twists reference series
Scholastic Special Edition

References

External links
 Ripley Publishing website

Ripley's Believe It or Not!
Book publishing companies of the United States
Jim Pattison Group